58 Zolfaghar Commando Division, Shahroud is a Takavar (commando)  division of the Ground Forces of Islamic Republic of Iran Army based in Shahroud, Semnan Province.

The founder and the first commander of the brigade was Yaghoub Aliyari.

References 

Special forces of Iran
Takavar Divisions of Ground Forces of Islamic Republic of Iran Army
Shahrud, Iran